Kneeland Airport  is a public airport operated by Humboldt County  southeast of Eureka, California. The airport has a California Dept. of Forestry (CDF) Helitack Station. Kneeland Airport is also used as an excellent sky watching location for the Humboldt Astronomers club.

Facilities 

Ecology
The airport bisects the only known population of the Kneeland Prairie pennycress (Thlaspi californicum), a federally listed endangered plant species.

Other local airports 
 Arcata-Eureka Airport
  Eureka Municipal Airport 
 Murray Field - in Eureka
 Rohnerville Airport

References

External links 
Live skycams at Kneeland Airport

Eureka, California
Airports in Humboldt County, California